A by-election was held for the New South Wales Legislative Assembly seat of Kurri Kurri on Saturday 8 October 1960 and was triggered by the death of George Booth.

The Temora by-election was held on the same day.

Dates

Result

George Booth died and was succeeded by his son Ken.

See also
Electoral results for the district of Kurri Kurri
List of New South Wales state by-elections

References

New South Wales state by-elections
1960 elections in Australia
1960s in New South Wales
October 1960 events in Australia